Ficus triradiata, commonly known as the red stipule fig, is a hemiepiphytic fig that is endemic to the wet tropical rainforests of northeastern Queensland, Australia.

Description
It begins life as a hemiepiphyte.

References

Trees of Australia
Flora of Queensland
triradiata
Rosales of Australia
Epiphytes
Taxa named by E. J. H. Corner